Mount Denison is a stratovolcano and one of the highest peaks on the Alaska Peninsula. Discovered in 1923 by Harvard professor Kirtley Fletcher Mather, the mountain was named for the geologist's alma mater, Denison University. The mountain's connection to Denison also include its first climbers: all members of the first two ascent teams as well as the group that attempted in 1977 were either students, alumni, or faculty of the university.

Mount Denison is located at the end of a volcanic chain in a heavily glaciated and very remote section of Katmai National Park. It is possibly the tallest mountain in the national park, though some sources list Mount Griggs as the highest. Mount Griggs, on the other hand, is much more accessible, being next to the Valley of Ten Thousand Smokes, which can be reached via the road from the national park's visitor center.

There is no record of an eruption, but Mount Denison was probably active some time in the last 10,000 years (the Holocene epoch).

See also
List of volcanoes in the United States of America

Notes

External links
 

Mountains of Kodiak Island Borough, Alaska
Volcanoes of Kodiak Island Borough, Alaska
Volcanoes of Lake and Peninsula Borough, Alaska
Mountains of Lake and Peninsula Borough, Alaska
Mountains of Alaska
Volcanoes of Alaska
Stratovolcanoes of the United States
Highest points of United States national parks
Aleutian Range